Walter Charles "Jack" Hammond (February 26, 1891 – March 4, 1942), nicknamed "Wobby", was an American second baseman in Major League Baseball who played for the Cleveland Indians and Pittsburgh Pirates. He batted and threw right-handed, had a height of 5'11" and a weight of 170 lbs. He went to Colgate University.

Born in Amsterdam, New York, Hammond played his first game on April 15, 1915 and his final game on June 16, 1922. He died at age 51 in Kenosha, Wisconsin.

References

External links

Baseball Almanac

1891 births
1942 deaths
People from Amsterdam, New York
Baseball players from New York (state)
Colgate Raiders baseball players
Major League Baseball second basemen
Cleveland Indians players
Pittsburgh Pirates players
Minor league baseball managers
Worcester Busters players
Lawrence Colts players
Springfield Ponies players
Portland Beavers players
Springfield Green Sox players
New London Planters players
Pittsfield Hillies players
Kansas City Blues (baseball) players